Bitcoin Magazine is one of the original news and print magazine publishers covering Bitcoin and digital currencies. Bitcoin Magazine began publishing in 2012. It was co-founded by Vitalik Buterin, Mihai Alisie, Matthew N. Wright, Vladimir Marchenko, and Vicente S. It is currently owned and operated by BTC Inc in Nashville, Tennessee.

History
Vitalik Buterin became interested in bitcoin in 2011, and co-founded the periodical Bitcoin Magazine with Mihai Alisie, who asked him to join. Alisie was living in Romania at the time, and Buterin was writing for a blog. Buterin's writing captured the attention of Alisie, and they subsequently decided to start the magazine. Buterin took the role of head writer as a side project while attending university.

In 2012, Bitcoin Magazine began publishing a print edition from its base in South Korea, and has been referred to as the first serious publication dedicated to cryptocurrencies. Buterin noted he spent 10-20 hours per week writing for the publication.

In early 2015, Bitcoin Magazine was sold to its current owners, BTC Inc.

Bitcoin Magazine at the Smithsonian 
A physical copy of a 2014 edition of Bitcoin Magazine was displayed in the Smithsonian Museum as part of the Value of Money exhibit.

Becoming Bitcoin only 
In December 2018, according to a company blog post, CEO David Bailey announced that Bitcoin Magazine "would be returning to its roots and shifting its focus to Bitcoin-related stories only."

Bitcoin Magazine in Ukraine 
In September 2021, Bitcoin Magazine announced the launch of their Eastern European bureau based in Kyiv.

Bitcoin Magazine and the NFL 
In December 2021, New England Patriots quarterback Mac Jones partnered with Bitcoin Magazine to gift both Bitcoin and Bitcoin Magazine subscriptions to his offensive line.

The Bitcoin Conference

Bitcoin 2019 
In June 2019, Bitcoin Magazine hosted Bitcoin 2019 at SVN West in San Francisco, California.

Speakers at the conference included Edward Snowden, Cathie Wood, Max Keiser, and Tim Draper.

Bitcoin 2020 
Bitcoin 2020 was cancelled due to complications with the COVID-19 pandemic.

Bitcoin 2021 
In June 2021, Bitcoin Magazine hosted Bitcoin 2021 at the Mana Wynwood in Miami, Florida. There were approximately 12,000 attendees.

Speakers at the conference included Jack Dorsey, Ron Paul, Kevin O'Leary, Cynthia Lummis, Tyler Winklevoss, Cameron Winklevoss, Francis X. Suarez, Warren Davidson, Floyd Mayweather Jr., and Tony Hawk.

In a prerecorded speech, El Salvador President Nayib Bukele announced his plans to adopt Bitcoin as legal tender in the Central American nation.

Bitcoin 2022 
Bitcoin 2022 occurred in April 2022 at the Miami Beach Convention Center in Miami Beach, Florida. Speakers included Adam Back, Michael J. Saylor, Jordan Peterson, and Andrew Yang.

References

External links

 Official Website

Bitcoin companies
Internet properties established in 2012
Cryptocurrencies